Zakir Hussain (January 1, 1934 – August 19, 2019) was a Pakistani field hockey player. He was born in Lahore. He won a gold medal at the 1968 Summer Olympics in Mexico City, and a silver medal at the 1956 Summer Olympics in Melbourne. He died on 19 August 2019.

References

External links

1934 births
2019 deaths
Field hockey players from Lahore
Pakistani male field hockey players
Olympic field hockey players of Pakistan
Olympic gold medalists for Pakistan
Olympic silver medalists for Pakistan
Olympic medalists in field hockey
Medalists at the 1956 Summer Olympics
Medalists at the 1968 Summer Olympics
Field hockey players at the 1956 Summer Olympics
Field hockey players at the 1968 Summer Olympics
Asian Games medalists in field hockey
Field hockey players at the 1958 Asian Games
Field hockey players at the 1962 Asian Games
Asian Games gold medalists for Pakistan
Medalists at the 1958 Asian Games
Medalists at the 1962 Asian Games
20th-century Pakistani people